Dimitri Romanovich Romanov (17 May 1926 – 31 December 2016) was a descendant of Russia's former ruling dynasty, a banker, philanthropist, and author. He was also a claimant to the headship of the Imperial House of Russia. At his death, the male line of the Nicholaevich branch of the Romanov family died out.

Early life

Dimitri Romanovich Romanov was born on 17 May 1926 in Cap d'Antibes, France, the second son of Prince Roman Petrovich of Russia and Countess Praskovia Sheremeteva. His older brother was Prince Nicholas Romanovich. Through his paternal lineage, he was a great-great grandson of Emperor Nicholas I of Russia (1796–1855) and his consort, Princess Charlotte of Prussia, who founded the Nikolaevichi branch of the Russian Imperial Family.

Romanov spent the first ten years of his life in Antibes, France, where he received a traditional Russian education. In 1936 his family moved to Italy, where he continued his education and for a time lived at the Royal Palace in Rome. In 1946 his family moved to Egypt, where they lived for a number of years before returning to Italy. In 1960 he moved to Denmark, where he worked for a number of banks including the Danske Bank, where he was an executive until his retirement in 1993. He was fluent in Russian, French, English, Danish, and Italian.

Marriages
Romanov was married twice. His first wife was Johanna von Kauffmann (1936–1989), whom he married in Copenhagen on 21 January 1959. After being widowed in 1989, he married Dorrit Reventlow (born 1942) in Kostroma on 28 July 1993. His second marriage was the first time a Romanov had been married in Russia since the fall of the dynasty.

Dimitri Romanovich died in Denmark on 31 December 2016, as reported by his wife Theodora (Dorrit). He had been urgently admitted to hospital the week before after a sharp deterioration in health status.

Charity work
Since his retirement Dimitri became involved in a number of charitable endeavours. In June 1992 he was one of seven Romanov princes who met in Paris where they decided to create the Romanov Fund for Russia with the task of carrying out charitable acts in post-communist Russia. He visited Russia in July 1993 on a fact finding mission to decide on what areas the charity should focus. Prince Dimitri has served as chairman of the Romanov Fund for Russia since its creation.

He was also chairman of the Prince Dimitri Romanov Charity Fund, which he founded in 2006.

Romanov Family Association
Dimitri was a member of the Romanov Family Association since 1979, the year of its creation, and served as a committee member. In July 1998, he joined other members of the Imperial family in St. Petersburg to attend the funeral of the last Russian emperor to reign, Nicholas II, and his family. In March 2003 the then Bulgarian Prime Minister, and former Tsar, Simeon Saxe-Coburg-Gotha invited Dimitri to attend events celebrating the liberation of Bulgaria from Ottoman rule during the Russo-Turkish War of 1877–1878.

In September 2006 after a successful lobbying campaign of the Danish royal family and President Vladimir Putin of Russia, he arranged for the remains of Dowager Empress Maria Feodorovna to be moved from Denmark, where she died in exile, to Russia so she could be buried alongside her husband Emperor Alexander III. After attending the divine service for Maria Feodorovna at the Roskilde Cathedral in Denmark, Prince Dimitri accompanied her remains on the Danish naval ship that transferred them to Russia. After their arrival, Prince Dimitri with other descendants of the Imperial family attended the reburial service in Russia.

As a descendant of the Electress Sophia of Hanover he was also eligible to succeed to the British throne.

Honours
  : Order of the Dannebrog 
  :
 Medal "In Commemoration of the 300th Anniversary of Saint Petersburg"
 Order of Friendship (20 June 2011)
 Order of Alexander Nevsky (6 October 2016)

Dynastic orders
  Montenegrin Royal Family :
 Knight of the Order of Saint Peter of Cetinje 
 Knight of the Order of Petrovic Njegos 
 Grand Cross of the Order of Prince Danilo I (4 June 2005)

Bibliography

Ancestry

References

External links
Romanov Fund for Russia
Romanov Family Association
The Prince Dimitri Romanov Charity Fund

1926 births
2016 deaths
Dimitri
Dimitri
Grand Crosses of the Order of the Dannebrog
Dimitri